Benjamin or Ben Roberts may refer to:

 Ben Roberts (politician) (1880–1952), New Zealand cabinet minister
 Benjamin Roberts (colonial administrator), Deputy Governor of Anguilla
 Benjamin F. Roberts (1815–1881), African American printer, writer, activist and abolitionist
 Benjamin S. Roberts (1810–1875), American Civil War general
 B. T. Roberts (1823–1893), American Methodist bishop
 Ben Roberts (writer) (1916–1984), one of the creators of Charlie's Angels television series
 Ben Roberts (actor) (1950–2021), British actor (The Bill)
 Ben Roberts (poker player) (born 1956), Iranian-born British poker player
 Ben Roberts (footballer) (born 1975), English footballer
 Ben Roberts (rugby league) (born 1985), New Zealand rugby league footballer
 Ben Roberts (American football) (born 1992), American football wide receiver